Dave McCaig (born December 6, 1971, in Thunder Bay, Ontario) is a Canadian artist and colourist who also works in the animation industry.

He has worked on comics including Adam Strange, X-Men, Star Wars, Superman: Birthright, The Matrix Comics, Nextwave, New Avengers, Northlanders, American Vampire, and Nemesis. Animation projects have included key colour design on the first three seasons of the Batman (2004) animated series at Warner Brothers and various duties on the fourth Teenage Mutant Ninja Turtles film.

He won the 2008 Joe Shuster Award for Best Colorist, which was awarded for the first time that year. McCaig also runs a forum for comic book colorists and artists called Gutterzombie.com.

References

External links
Personal website
Gutterzombie
Interview in The Pulse

1971 births
Artists from Ontario
Canadian cartoonists
Canadian comics artists
Comics colorists
Joe Shuster Award winners for Outstanding Colourist
Living people
People from Thunder Bay